The 2015 Charlottesville Men's Pro Challenger was a professional tennis tournament played on indoor hard courts. It was the seventh edition of the tournament which was part of the 2015 ATP Challenger Tour, taking place in Charlottesville, United States from November 2 to November 8, 2015.

Singles main-draw entrants

Seeds

 1 Rankings are as of October 26, 2015.

Other entrants
The following players received wildcards into the singles main draw:
  Collin Altamirano
  Ernesto Escobedo
  Ryan Shane
  Mac Styslinger

The following player received entry as an alternate:
  Tommy Paul
 
The following players received entry from the qualifying draw:
  Takanyi Garanganga 
  Stefan Kozlov 
  David Rice
  Noah Rubin

Champions

Singles

 Noah Rubin def.  Tommy Paul 3–6, 7–6(9–7), 6–3

Doubles

 Chase Buchanan /  Tennys Sandgren def.  Peter Polansky /  Adil Shamasdin 3–6, 6–4, [10–5]

Charlottesville Men's Pro Challenger
Charlottesville Men's Pro Challenger
Charlottesville Men's Pro Challenger
Charlottesville Men's Pro Challenger